Diploglossus nigropunctatus, the Cuban spotted galliwasp, is a species of lizard of the Diploglossidae family endemic to Cuba.

References

Diploglossus
Reptiles described in 1937
Reptiles of Cuba
Endemic fauna of Cuba
Taxa named by Thomas Barbour
Taxa named by Benjamin Shreve